Ano Karyofyto (previously known as Kozloutza) is a settlement in the municipality Xanthi in the Xanthi regional unit of Greece. It is located north northwest of Stavroupoli and 39.9 kilometers southeast of Xanthi. In 2011, the population of the village was 105.

External links
Greek Travel Pages - Karyofyto

Populated places in Xanthi (regional unit)